Hector Dion (1881–1943) was an American film actor of the silent era.

Selected filmography
 Just Like a Woman (1912)
 The Wrong Bottle (1913)
 The Crook and the Girl (1913)
 A Tender-Hearted Crook (1913)
 The Stopped Clock (1913)
 The Shepherd Lassie of Argyle (1914)
 The $5,000,000 Counterfeiting Plot (1914)
 Shopgirls (1914)
 The Return of Draw Egan (1916)
 Silas Marner (1916)
 King Lear (1916)
 Fighting Mad (1917)
 One More American (1918)
 The Wolf and His Mate (1918)
 Painted Lips (1918)
 Judge Her Not (1921)

References

Bibliography
 Low, Rachael. The History of the British Film 1914-1918. Routledge, 2005.

External links

1881 births
1943 deaths
American male film actors
People from Boston